William IV of Hesse-Kassel (24 June 153225 August 1592), also called William the Wise, was the first Landgrave of the Landgraviate of Hesse-Kassel (or Hesse-Cassel). He was the founder of the oldest line, which survives to this day.

Life

Landgrave
William was born in Kassel, the eldest son of Landgrave Philip the Magnanimous and Christine of Saxony. After his father's death in 1567, the Landgraviate of Hesse was divided between the four sons out of the late Landgrave of Hesse's first marriage, and William received the portion around the capital Kassel, the Landgraviate of Hesse-Kassel.

William took a leading part in safeguarding the Lutheran Reformation, and was indefatigable in his endeavours to unite the different sections of Protestantism against Catholicism. However, he was reluctant to use military force in this conflict.

As an administrator he displayed rare energy, issuing numerous ordinances, appointing expert officials, and in particular ordering his slender finances. By a law of primogeniture he secured his Landgraviate's land against such testamentary divisions as had diminished his father's estate.

Astronomical work
William is most notable for his patronage of the arts and sciences. As a youth he had cultivated close connections with scholars and as a ruler he kept up this connection. His interest in astronomy may have been inspired by Petrus Apianus's Astronomicum Caesareum.

William was a pioneer in astronomical research, and perhaps owes his most lasting fame to his discoveries in this branch of study. Most of the mechanical contrivances which made instruments of  Tycho Brahe so superior to those of his contemporaries were adopted in Kassel about 1584. From then on the observations made in Hesse-Kassel seem to have been about as accurate as those of Tycho. However the resulting longitudes were 6' too great in consequence of the adopted solar parallax of 3'.

Hessian star catalogue

The principal product of the astronomical observations was the Hessian star catalogue, a catalogue of about a thousand stars. The locations were determined by the methods usually employed in the 16th century, connecting a fundamental star by means of Venus with the sun, and thus finding its longitude and latitude, while other stars could at any time be referred to the fundamental star. It should be noticed that clocks, on which Tycho depended very little, were used at Kassel for finding the difference of right ascension between Venus and the sun before sunset. Tycho preferred observing the angular distance between the sun and Venus when the latter was visible in the daytime.

The Hessian star catalogue was published in Historia coelestis (Augsburg, 1666) by Albert Curtz, and a number of other observations are to be found in Coeli et siderum in eo errantium observationes Hassiacae (Leiden, 1618), edited by Willebrord Snell.

R. Wolf, in his Astronomische Mittheilungen, No. 45 (Vierteljahrsschrift der naturforschenden Gesellschaft in Zurich, 1878), has given a resume of the manuscripts still preserved at Kassel, which throw much light on the methods adopted in the observations and reductions.

Family and children
William was married to Sabine of Württemberg, daughter of Christoph, Duke of Württemberg.
They had the following children:
 Anna Maria of Hesse-Kassel (27 January 156721 November 1626), married on 8 June 1589 to Louis II, Count of Nassau-Weilburg
 Hedwig of Hesse-Kassel (30 June 15697 July 1644), married on 11 September 1597 to Ernst of Schaumburg
 Agnes of Hesse-Kassel (30 June 15695 September 1569)
 Sofie of Hesse-Kassel (10 June 157118 January 1616)
 Maurice, Landgrave of Hesse-Kassel (25 May 157215 March 1632), succeeded as landgrave on William IV's death in 1592.
 Sabine of Hesse-Kassel (12 May 157329 November 1573)
 Sidonie of Hesse-Kassel (29 June 15744 April 1575)
 Christian of Hesse-Kassel (14 October 15759 November 1578)
 Elisabeth of Hesse-Kassel (11 May 157725 November 1578)
 Christine (19 October 157819 August 1658), married on 14 May 1598 to John Ernst, Duke of Saxe-Eisenach
 Juliane, born and died 9 February 1581

In addition William had a few illegitimate children. Most significant and favored among these was Philipp von Cornberg (1553–1616), William's son by Elisabeth Wallenstein. Philipp was ennobled by his father and became the ancestor of the current Barons von Cornberg.

Ancestors

References

External links

 Biographical data and references at The Galileo Project

|-

William 4
16th-century German astronomers
Scientists from Kassel
People from the Landgraviate of Hesse-Kassel
1532 births
1592 deaths
Landgraves of Hesse
Hesse-Kassel, William IV, Landgrave of